The canton of Évron is an administrative division of the Mayenne department, northwestern France. Its borders were modified at the French canton reorganisation which came into effect in March 2015. Its seat is in Évron.

It consists of the following communes:
 
Assé-le-Bérenger
Bais
La Bazouge-des-Alleux
Brée
Champgenéteux
Évron
Hambers
Izé
Livet
Mézangers
Montsûrs
Neau
Sainte-Gemmes-le-Robert
Saint-Georges-sur-Erve
Saint-Thomas-de-Courceriers
Trans
Vimartin-sur-Orthe
Voutré

References

Cantons of Mayenne